Spatalla propinqua, the lax spoon, is a flower-bearing shrub belonging to genus Spatalla, and forming a part of the fynbos vegetation. The plant is native to the Western Cape, South Africa.

Description
Fire destroys the plant but the seeds survive. The plant is bisexual and pollinated by insects. The fruit ripens two months after the plant has flowered, and the seeds fall to the ground where they are spread by ants.

Distribution and habitat
The plant occurs from the Slanghoek Mountains to the Riviersonderend Mountains.

References

External links
Threatened Species Programme | SANBI Red List of South African Plants
Spatalla propinqua (Lax spoon)
Triplespoons
Spatalla propinqua R.Br. 1810 bl 72

propinqua